Sale Creek is an unincorporated community and census-designated place (CDP) in northern Hamilton County, Tennessee, United States. It is located along U.S. Route 27 between Chattanooga and Dayton, Tennessee.

Sale Creek's population was 2,901 as of the 2020 census. Sale Creek is home to Sale Creek Middle/High School.  A local curiosity, the reportedly "haunted" Shipley Hollow Road, is in Sale Creek.

Demographics

History
The community takes its name from the creek which runs through it.  The creek got its name from the auction held along its banks consisting of the goods and arms taken from the eleven towns of the militant Cherokee in the region before they were burned during the raid of Evan Shelby's troops in 1779 during the Cherokee–American wars.

The area was occupied by the 6th Tennessee Infantry US from September to December 1863 during the Civil War.

MSA
Sale Creek is part of the Chattanooga, TN–GA Metropolitan Statistical Area.

References

Census-designated places in Hamilton County, Tennessee
Unincorporated communities in Tennessee
Census-designated places in Tennessee
Chattanooga metropolitan area
Unincorporated communities in Hamilton County, Tennessee